The Yakovlev AIR-16, also known as Yakovlev LT-2 or Yakovlev No.16 was a 4-seat cabin monoplane touring aircraft, designed and built in the USSR during 1937. Intended to be powered by a  Renault Bengali 6 engine, the AIR-16 was never flown. Sources differ but in his memoirs, Yevgeniy Adler, Kotovs successor, put the failure to fly down to inherent design weaknesses that were not able to be rectified.

References

1930s Soviet sport aircraft
AIR-16
Single-engined tractor aircraft
Low-wing aircraft